Walnut Green School, also known as District School Number 25, is a historic one-room school building located at Greenville, New Castle County, Delaware.  It was founded in 1808 and in 1924 was said to be the oldest schoolhouse in the state.  It is a one-story, five-bay, rectangular, gambrel-roofed, white-stuccoed stone building in the Colonial Revival style.  The school building dates to the late-18th century, but was expanded and remodeled in 1918–1924.  The school closed in 1947, because parents wanted their children to go to the AI duPont school district. 

It was listed on the National Register of Historic Places in 1994.

References

One-room schoolhouses in Delaware
School buildings on the National Register of Historic Places in Delaware
Colonial Revival architecture in Delaware
School buildings completed in 1924
Schools in New Castle County, Delaware
National Register of Historic Places in New Castle County, Delaware
1924 establishments in Delaware